Padernense Clube is a Portuguese sports club from Paderne, Albufeira.

The men's football team plays in the Algarve Football Association Division Two. The team had a short stint on the third tier when contesting the 2001–02 Segunda Divisão B, but was relegated. This year the team also reached the second round of the Taça de Portugal. After that, they were instantly relegated from the 2002–03 Terceira Divisão as well. Between 2011 and 2013, no team was fielded at all.

References

Football clubs in Portugal
Association football clubs established in 1933
1933 establishments in Portugal